A fertilizer (American English) or fertiliser (British English; see spelling differences) is any material of natural or synthetic origin that is applied to soil or to plant tissues to supply plant nutrients. Fertilizers may be distinct from liming materials or other non-nutrient soil amendments. Many sources of fertilizer exist, both natural and industrially produced. For most modern agricultural practices, fertilization focuses on three main macro nutrients: nitrogen (N), phosphorus (P), and potassium (K) with occasional addition of supplements like rock flour for micronutrients. Farmers apply these fertilizers in a variety of ways: through dry or pelletized or liquid application processes, using large agricultural equipment or hand-tool methods.

Historically fertilization came from natural or organic sources: compost, animal manure, human manure, harvested minerals, crop rotations and byproducts of human-nature industries (i.e. fish processing waste, or bloodmeal from animal slaughter). However, starting in the 19th century, after innovations in plant nutrition, an agricultural industry developed around synthetically created fertilizers. This transition was important in transforming the global food system, allowing for larger-scale industrial agriculture with large crop yields. 

Nitrogen-fixing chemical processes such as the Haber process at the beginning of the 20th century, amplified by production capacity created during World War II led to a boom in using nitrogen fertilizers. In the latter half of the 20th century, increased the use of nitrogen fertilizers (800% increase between 1961 and 2019) have been a crucial component of the increased productivity of conventional food systems (more than 30% per capita) as part of the so-called "Green Revolution". The use of artificial and industrially-applied fertilizers has led to a number of environmental impacts, creating water pollution and Eutrophication caused by nutritional runoff, carbon and other emissions from fertilizer production and mining, and contamination and pollution of soil. Various types of sustainable agriculture practices can be implemented to reduce the environmental impact of fertilizer uses alongside other environmental impacts of agriculture.

History

Management of soil fertility has preoccupied farmers for thousands of years. Egyptians, Romans, Babylonians, and early Germans are all recorded as using minerals or manure to enhance the productivity of their farms. The science of plant nutrition started well before the work of German chemist Justus von Liebig although his name is most mentioned. Nicolas Théodore de Saussure and scientific colleagues at the time were quick to disprove the simplifications of Justus von Liebig. There was a complex scientific understanding of plant nutrition, where the role of humus and organo-mineral interactions were central, and which was in line with more recent discoveries from 1990 onwards. Prominent scientists on whom Justus von Liebig drew were Carl Ludwig Sprenger and Hermann Hellriegel. In this field, a 'knowledge erosion' took place, partly driven by an intermingling of economics and research. John Bennet Lawes, an English entrepreneur, began to experiment on the effects of various manures on plants growing in pots in 1837, and a year or two later the experiments were extended to crops in the field. One immediate consequence was that in 1842 he patented a manure formed by treating phosphates with sulfuric acid, and thus was the first to create the artificial manure industry. In the succeeding year he enlisted the services of Joseph Henry Gilbert; together they performed crop experiments at the Institute of Arable Crops Research.

The Birkeland–Eyde process was one of the competing industrial processes in the beginning of nitrogen-based fertilizer production. This process was used to fix atmospheric nitrogen (N2) into nitric acid (HNO3), one of several chemical processes generally referred to as nitrogen fixation. The resultant nitric acid was then used as a source of nitrate (NO3−). A factory based on the process was built in Rjukan and Notodden in Norway, combined with the building of large hydroelectric power facilities.

The 1910s and 1920s witnessed the rise of the Haber process and the Ostwald process. The Haber process produces ammonia (NH3) from methane (CH4) (natural gas) gas and molecular nitrogen (N2) from the air. The ammonia from the Haber process is then partially converted into nitric acid (HNO3) in the Ostwald process. After World War II, Nitrogen production plants that had ramped up for war-time bomb manufacturing were pivoted towards agriculture uses. The use of synthetic nitrogen fertilizers has increased steadily in the last 50 years, rising almost 20-fold to the current rate of 100 million tonnes of nitrogen per year.

The development of synthetic nitrogen fertilizer has significantly supported global population growth — it has been estimated that almost half the people on the Earth are currently fed as a result of synthetic nitrogen fertilizer use. The use of phosphate fertilizers has also increased from 9 million tonnes per year in 1960 to 40 million tonnes per year in 2000. A maize crop yielding 6–9 tonnes of grain per hectare requires  of phosphate fertilizer to be applied; soybean crops require about half, as 20–25 kg per hectare. Yara International is the world's largest producer of nitrogen-based fertilizers.

Mechanism

Fertilizers enhance the growth of plants. This goal is met in two ways, the traditional one being additives that provide nutrients.  The second mode by which some fertilizers act is to enhance the effectiveness of the soil by modifying its water retention and aeration.  This article, like many on fertilizers, emphasises the nutritional aspect.
Fertilizers typically provide, in varying proportions:
 three main macronutrients:
 Nitrogen (N): leaf growth
 Phosphorus (P): development of roots, flowers, seeds, fruit;
 Potassium (K): strong stem growth, movement of water in plants, promotion of flowering and fruiting;
 three secondary macronutrients: calcium (Ca), magnesium (Mg), and sulfur (S);
 micronutrients: copper (Cu), iron (Fe), manganese (Mn), molybdenum (Mo), zinc (Zn), boron (B). Of occasional significance are silicon (Si), cobalt (Co), and vanadium (V).

The nutrients required for healthy plant life are classified according to the elements, but the elements are not used as fertilizers.  Instead compounds containing these elements are the basis of fertilizers.  The macro-nutrients are consumed in larger quantities and are present in plant tissue in quantities from 0.15% to 6.0% on a dry matter (DM) (0% moisture) basis. Plants are made up of four main elements: hydrogen, oxygen, carbon, and nitrogen.  Carbon, hydrogen and oxygen are widely available as water and carbon dioxide. Although nitrogen makes up most of the atmosphere, it is in a form that is unavailable to plants. Nitrogen is the most important fertilizer since nitrogen is present in proteins, DNA and other components (e.g., chlorophyll).  To be nutritious to plants, nitrogen must be made available in a "fixed" form. Only some bacteria and their host plants (notably legumes) can fix atmospheric nitrogen (N2) by converting it to ammonia.  Phosphate is required for the production of DNA and ATP, the main energy carrier in cells, as well as certain lipids.

Microbiological considerations
Two sets of enzymatic reactions are highly relevant to the efficiency of nitrogen-based fertilizers.  
Urease
The first is the hydrolysis (reaction with water) of urea. Many soil bacteria possess the enzyme urease, which catalyzes conversion of urea to ammonium ion (NH4+) and bicarbonate ion (HCO3−). 
Ammonia oxidation
Ammonia-oxidizing bacteria (AOB), such as species of Nitrosomonas, oxidize ammonia to nitrite, a process termed nitrification. Nitrite-oxidizing bacteria, especially Nitrobacter, oxidize nitrite to nitrate, which is extremely mobile and is a major cause of eutrophication.

Classification
Fertilizers are classified in several ways.  They are classified according to whether they provide a single nutrient (e.g., K, P, or N), in which case they are classified as "straight fertilizers".  "multinutrient fertilizers" (or "complex fertilizers") provide two or more nutrients, for example N and P.  Fertilizers are also sometimes classified as inorganic (the topic of most of this article) versus organic.  Inorganic fertilizers exclude carbon-containing materials except ureas.  Organic fertilizers are usually (recycled) plant- or animal-derived matter.  Inorganic are sometimes called synthetic fertilizers since various chemical treatments are required for their manufacture.

Single nutrient ("straight") fertilizers
The main nitrogen-based straight fertilizer is ammonia or its solutions. Ammonium nitrate (NH4NO3) is also widely used. Urea is another popular source of nitrogen, having the advantage that it is solid and non-explosive, unlike ammonia and ammonium nitrate, respectively. A few percent of the nitrogen fertilizer market (4% in 2007) has been met by calcium ammonium nitrate.

The main straight phosphate fertilizers are the superphosphates. "Single superphosphate" (SSP) consists of 14–18% P2O5, again in the form of Ca(H2PO4)2, but also phosphogypsum. Triple superphosphate (TSP) typically consists of 44–48% of P2O5 and no gypsum. A mixture of single superphosphate and triple superphosphate is called double superphosphate. More than 90% of a typical superphosphate fertilizer is water-soluble.

The main potassium-based straight fertilizer is muriate of potash (MOP). Muriate of potash consists of 95–99% KCl, and is typically available as 0-0-60 or 0-0-62 fertilizer.

Multinutrient fertilizers
These fertilizers are common. They consist of two or more nutrient components.

Binary (NP, NK, PK) fertilizers
Major two-component fertilizers provide both nitrogen and phosphorus to the plants. These are called NP fertilizers. The main NP fertilizers are monoammonium phosphate (MAP) and diammonium phosphate (DAP). The active ingredient in MAP is NH4H2PO4. The active ingredient in DAP is (NH4)2HPO4. About 85% of MAP and DAP fertilizers are soluble in water.

NPK fertilizers

NPK fertilizers are three-component fertilizers providing nitrogen, phosphorus, and potassium. There exist two types of NPK fertilizers: compound and blends. Compound NPK fertilizers contain chemically bound ingredients, while blended NPK fertilizers are physical mixtures of single nutrient components.

NPK rating is a rating system describing the amount of nitrogen, phosphorus, and potassium in a fertilizer. NPK ratings consist of three numbers separated by dashes (e.g., 10-10-10 or 16-4-8) describing the chemical content of fertilizers. The first number represents the percentage of nitrogen in the product; the second number, P2O5; the third, K2O. Fertilizers do not actually contain P2O5 or K2O, but the system is a conventional shorthand for the amount of the phosphorus (P) or potassium (K) in a fertilizer. A  bag of fertilizer labeled 16-4-8 contains  of nitrogen (16% of the 50 pounds), an amount of phosphorus equivalent to that in 2 pounds of P2O5 (4% of 50 pounds), and 4 pounds of K2O (8% of 50 pounds). Most fertilizers are labeled according to this N-P-K convention, although Australian convention, following an N-P-K-S system, adds a fourth number for sulfur, and uses elemental values for all values including P and K.

Micronutrients
Micronutrients are consumed in smaller quantities and are present in plant tissue on the order of parts-per-million (ppm), ranging from 0.15 to 400 ppm or less than 0.04% dry matter. These elements are often required for enzymes essential to the plant's metabolism.  Because these elements enable catalysts (enzymes), their impact far exceeds their weight percentage. Typical micronutrients are boron, zinc, molybdenum, iron, and manganese. These elements are provided as water-soluble salts. Iron presents special problems because it converts to insoluble (bio-unavailable) compounds at moderate soil pH and phosphate concentrations. For this reason, iron is often administered as a chelate complex, e.g., the EDTA or EDDHA derivatives. The micronutrient needs depend on the plant and the environment. For example, sugar beets appear to require boron, and legumes require cobalt, while environmental conditions such as heat or drought make boron less available for plants.

Environment
Synthetic fertilizer used in agriculture has wide-reaching environmental consequences. According to the Intergovernmental Panel on Climate Change (IPCC) Special Report on Climate Change and Land, production of these fertilizers and associated land use practices are drivers of global warming. The use of fertilizer has also led to a number of direct environmental consequences: agricultural runoff which leads to downstream effects like ocean dead zones and waterway contamination, soil microbiome degradation, and accumulation of toxins in ecosystems. Indirect environmental impacts include: the environmental impacts of fracking for natural gas used in the Haber process, the agricultural boom is partially responsible for the rapid growth in human population and large-scale industrial agricultural practices are associated with habitat destruction, pressure on biodiversity and agricultural soil loss.

In order to mitigate environmental and food security concerns, the international community has included food systems in Sustainable Development Goal 2 which focuses on creating a climate-friendly and sustainable food production system. Most policy and regulatory approaches to address these issues focus on pivoting agricultural practices towards sustainable or regenerative agricultural practices: these use less synthetic fertilizers, better soil management (for example no-till agriculture) and more organic fertilizers.

Production
The production of synthetic, or inorganic, fertilizers requires prepared chemicals, whereas organic fertilizers are derived from the organic processes of plants and animals in biological processes using biochemicals.

Nitrogen fertilizers

Nitrogen fertilizers are made from ammonia (NH3) produced by the Haber–Bosch process. In this energy-intensive process, natural gas (CH4) usually supplies the hydrogen, and the nitrogen (N2) is derived from the air. This ammonia is used as a feedstock for all other nitrogen fertilizers, such as anhydrous ammonium nitrate (NH4NO3) and urea (CO(NH2)2).

Deposits of sodium nitrate (NaNO3) (Chilean saltpeter) are also found in the Atacama desert in Chile and was one of the original (1830) nitrogen-rich fertilizers used. It is still mined for fertilizer. Nitrates are also produced from ammonia by the Ostwald process.

Phosphate fertilizers

Phosphate fertilizers are obtained by extraction from phosphate rock, which contains two principal phosphorus-containing minerals, fluorapatite Ca5(PO4)3F (CFA) and hydroxyapatite Ca5(PO4)3OH.  These minerals are converted into water-soluble phosphate salts by treatment with sulfuric (H2SO4) or phosphoric acids (H3PO4). The large production of sulfuric acid is primarily motivated by this application. In the nitrophosphate process or Odda process (invented in 1927), phosphate rock with up to a 20% phosphorus (P) content is dissolved with nitric acid (HNO3) to produce a mixture of phosphoric acid (H3PO4) and calcium nitrate (Ca(NO3)2). This mixture can be combined with a potassium fertilizer to produce a compound fertilizer with the three macronutrients N, P and K in easily dissolved form.

Potassium fertilizers
Potash is a mixture of potassium minerals used to make potassium (chemical symbol: K) fertilizers. Potash is soluble in water, so the main effort in producing this nutrient from the ore involves some purification steps; e.g., to remove sodium chloride (NaCl) (common salt).  Sometimes potash is referred to as K2O, as a matter of convenience to those describing the potassium content.  In fact, potash fertilizers are usually potassium chloride, potassium sulfate, potassium carbonate, or potassium nitrate.

NPK fertilizers

There are four major routes for manufacturing NPK fertilizers (named for their main ingredients: nitrogen (N), phosphorus (P), and potassium (K)):
 steam granulation, 
 chemical granulation, 
 compaction, 
 bulk blending.
The first three processes are used to produce compound NPKs. During steam granulation raw materials are mixed and further granulated using steam as binding agent. Chemical granulation process is based on chemical reactions between liquid raw materials (such as phosphoric acid, sulfuric acid, ammonia) and solid raw materials (such as potassium chloride, recycle material). Compaction implements high pressure to agglomerate dry powder materials. Lastly, bulk blends are produced by mixing straight fertilizers.

Organic fertilizers

"Organic fertilizers" can describe those fertilizers with an organic – biologic – origin—that is, fertilizers derived from living or formerly living materials.  Organic fertilizers can also describe commercially available and frequently packaged products that strive to follow the expectations and restrictions adopted by "organic agriculture" and "environmentally friendly" gardening – related systems of food and plant production that significantly limit or strictly avoid the use of synthetic fertilizers and pesticides.  The "organic fertilizer" products typically contain both some organic materials as well as acceptable additives such as nutritive rock powders, ground sea shells (crab, oyster, etc.), other prepared products such as seed meal or kelp, and cultivated microorganisms and derivatives.

Fertilizers of an organic origin (the first definition) include animal wastes, plant wastes from agriculture, seaweed, compost, and treated sewage sludge (biosolids). Beyond manures, animal sources can include products from the slaughter of animals – bloodmeal, bone meal, feather meal, hides, hoofs, and horns all are typical components. Organically derived materials available to industry such as sewage sludge may not be acceptable components of organic farming and gardening, because of factors ranging from residual contaminants to public perception. On the other hand, marketed "organic fertilizers" may include, and promote, processed organics because the materials have consumer appeal. No matter the definition nor composition, most of these products contain less-concentrated nutrients, and the nutrients are not as easily quantified. They can offer soil-building advantages as well as be appealing to those who are trying to farm / garden more "naturally".

In terms of volume, peat is the most widely used packaged organic soil amendment. It is an immature form of coal and improves the soil by aeration and absorbing water but confers no nutritional value to the plants. It is therefore not a fertilizer as defined in the beginning of the article, but rather an amendment. Coir, (derived from coconut husks), bark, and sawdust when added to soil all act similarly (but not identically) to peat and are also considered organic soil amendments – or texturizers – because of their limited nutritive inputs.  Some organic additives can have a reverse effect on nutrients – fresh sawdust can consume soil nutrients as it breaks down, and may lower soil pH – but these same organic texturizers (as well as compost, etc.) may increase the availability of nutrients through improved cation exchange, or through increased growth of microorganisms that in turn increase availability of certain plant nutrients. Organic fertilizers such as composts and manures may be distributed locally without going into industry production, making actual consumption more difficult to quantify.

Application

Fertilizers are commonly used for growing all crops, with application rates depending on the soil fertility, usually as measured by a soil test and according to the particular crop. Legumes, for example, fix nitrogen from the atmosphere and generally do not require nitrogen fertilizer.

Liquid vs solid
Fertilizers are applied to crops both as solids and as liquid. About 90% of fertilizers are applied as solids. The most widely used solid inorganic fertilizers are urea, diammonium phosphate and potassium chloride. Solid fertilizer is typically granulated or powdered.  Often solids are available as prills, a solid globule.  Liquid fertilizers comprise anhydrous ammonia, aqueous solutions of ammonia, aqueous solutions of ammonium nitrate or urea.  These concentrated products may be diluted with water to form a concentrated liquid fertilizer (e.g., UAN). Advantages of liquid fertilizer are its more rapid effect and easier coverage. The addition of fertilizer to irrigation water is called "fertigation".

Urea

Urea is highly soluble in water and is therefore also very suitable for use in fertilizer solutions (in combination with ammonium nitrate: UAN), e.g., in 'foliar feed' fertilizers. For fertilizer use, granules are preferred over prills because of their narrower particle size distribution, which is an advantage for mechanical application.

Urea is usually spread at rates of between 40 and 300 kg/ha (35 to 270 lbs/acre) but rates vary. Smaller applications incur lower losses due to leaching. During summer, urea is often spread just before or during rain to minimize losses from volatilization (a process wherein nitrogen is lost to the atmosphere as ammonia gas).

Because of the high nitrogen concentration in urea, it is very important to achieve an even spread.  Drilling must not occur on contact with or close to seed, due to the risk of germination damage. Urea dissolves in water for application as a spray or through irrigation systems.

In grain and cotton crops, urea is often applied at the time of the last cultivation before planting. In high rainfall areas and on sandy soils (where nitrogen can be lost through leaching) and where good in-season rainfall is expected, urea can be side- or top-dressed during the growing season. Top-dressing is also popular on pasture and forage crops. In cultivating sugarcane, urea is side-dressed after planting, and applied to each ratoon crop.

Because it absorbs moisture from the atmosphere, urea is often stored in closed containers.

Overdose or placing urea near seed is harmful.

Slow- and controlled-release fertilizers

Foliar application
Foliar fertilizers are applied directly to leaves. This method is almost invariably used to apply water-soluble straight nitrogen fertilizers and used especially for high-value crops such as fruits.  Urea is the most common foliar fertilizer.

Chemicals that affect nitrogen uptake

Various chemicals are used to enhance the efficiency of nitrogen-based fertilizers.  In this way farmers can limit the polluting effects of nitrogen run-off.  Nitrification inhibitors (also known as nitrogen stabilizers) suppress the conversion of ammonia into nitrate, an anion that is more prone to leaching.  1-Carbamoyl-3-methylpyrazole (CMP), dicyandiamide, nitrapyrin (2-chloro-6-trichloromethylpyridine) and 3,4-Dimethylpyrazole phosphate (DMPP) are popular. Urease inhibitors are used to slow the hydrolytic conversion of urea into ammonia, which is prone to evaporation as well as nitrification.  The conversion of urea to ammonia catalyzed by enzymes called ureases.  A popular inhibitor of ureases is N-(n-butyl)thiophosphoric triamide (NBPT).

Overfertilization
Careful use of fertilization technologies is important because excess nutrients can be detrimental. Fertilizer burn can occur when too much fertilizer is applied, resulting in damage or even death of the plant. Fertilizers vary in their tendency to burn roughly in accordance with their salt index.

Statistics

Recently nitrogen fertilizers have plateaued in most developed countries. China although has become the largest producer and consumer of nitrogen fertilizers. Africa has little reliance on nitrogen fertilizers. Agricultural and chemical minerals are very important in industrial use of fertilizers, which is valued at approximately $200 billion. Nitrogen has a significant impact in the global mineral use, followed by potash and phosphate. The production of nitrogen has drastically increased since the 1960s. Phosphate and potash have increased in price since the 1960s, which is larger than the consumer price index. Potash is produced in Canada, Russia and Belarus, together making up over half of the world production. Potash production in Canada rose in 2017 and 2018 by 18.6%. Conservative estimates report 30 to 50% of crop yields are attributed to natural or synthetic commercial fertilizers. Fertilizer consumption has surpassed the amount of farmland in the United States. Global market value is likely to rise to more than US$185 billion until 2019. The European fertilizer market will grow to earn revenues of approx. €15.3 billion in 2018.

Data on the fertilizer consumption per hectare arable land in 2012 are published by The World Bank. The diagram below shows fertilizer consumption by the European Union (EU) countries as kilograms per hectare (pounds per acre). The total consumption of fertilizer in the EU is 15.9 million tons for 105 million hectare arable land area (or 107 million hectare arable land according to another estimate). This figure equates to 151 kg of fertilizers consumed per ha arable land on average by the EU countries.

Environmental effects
Use of fertilizers is beneficial in providing nutrients to plants although they have some negative environmental effects. The large growing consumption of fertilizers can affect soil, surface water, and groundwater due to the dispersion of mineral use. 

For each ton of phosphoric acid produced by the processing of phosphate rock, five tons of waste are generated.  This waste takes the form of impure, useless, radioactive solid called phosphogypsum.  Estimates range from 100,000,000 and 280,000,000 tons of phosphogypsum waste produced annually worldwide.

Water

Phosphorus and nitrogen fertilizers when commonly used have major environmental effects. This is due to high rainfalls causing the fertilizers to be washed into waterways. Agricultural run-off is a major contributor to the eutrophication of fresh water bodies. For example, in the US, about half of all the lakes are eutrophic.  The main contributor to eutrophication is phosphate, which is normally a limiting nutrient; high concentrations promote the growth of cyanobacteria and algae, the demise of which consumes oxygen. Cyanobacteria blooms ('algal blooms') can also produce harmful toxins that can accumulate in the food chain, and can be harmful to humans. Fertilizer run-off can be reduced by using weather-optimised fertilization strategies.

The nitrogen-rich compounds found in fertilizer runoff are the primary cause of serious oxygen depletion in many parts of oceans, especially in coastal zones, lakes and rivers. The resulting lack of dissolved oxygen greatly reduces the ability of these areas to sustain oceanic fauna. The number of oceanic dead zones near inhabited coastlines is increasing. 

As of 2006, the application of nitrogen fertilizer is being increasingly controlled in northwestern Europe and the United States. In cases where eutrophication can be reversed, it may nevertheless take decades and significant soil management before the accumulated nitrates in groundwater can be broken down by natural processes.

Nitrate pollution
Only a fraction of the nitrogen-based fertilizers is converted to plant matter.  The remainder accumulates in the soil or is lost as run-off. High application rates of nitrogen-containing fertilizers combined with the high water solubility of nitrate leads to increased runoff into surface water as well as leaching into groundwater, thereby causing groundwater pollution. The excessive use of nitrogen-containing fertilizers (be they synthetic or natural) is particularly damaging, as much of the nitrogen that is not taken up by plants is transformed into nitrate which is easily leached.

Nitrate levels above 10 mg/L (10 ppm) in groundwater can cause 'blue baby syndrome' (acquired methemoglobinemia). The nutrients, especially nitrates, in fertilizers can cause problems for natural habitats and for human health if they are washed off soil into watercourses or leached through soil into groundwater.

Soil

Acidification

Nitrogen-containing fertilizers can cause soil acidification when added. This may lead to decrease in nutrient availability which may be offset by liming.

Accumulation of toxic elements

Cadmium
The concentration of cadmium in phosphorus-containing fertilizers varies considerably and can be problematic. For example, mono-ammonium phosphate fertilizer may have a cadmium content of as low as 0.14 mg/kg or as high as 50.9 mg/kg. The phosphate rock used in their manufacture can contain as much as 188 mg/kg cadmium (examples are deposits on Nauru and the Christmas islands). Continuous use of high-cadmium fertilizer can contaminate soil (as shown in New Zealand) and plants. Limits to the cadmium content of phosphate fertilizers has been considered by the European Commission. Producers of phosphorus-containing fertilizers now select phosphate rock based on the cadmium content.

Fluoride
Phosphate rocks contain high levels of fluoride.  Consequently, the widespread use of phosphate fertilizers has increased soil fluoride concentrations. It has been found that food contamination from fertilizer is of little concern as plants accumulate little fluoride from the soil; of greater concern is the possibility of fluoride toxicity to livestock that ingest contaminated soils. Also of possible concern are the effects of fluoride on soil microorganisms.

Radioactive elements
The radioactive content of the fertilizers varies considerably and depends both on their concentrations in the parent mineral and on the fertilizer production process. Uranium-238 concentrations can range from 7 to 100 pCi/g (picocuries per gram) in phosphate rock and from 1 to 67 pCi/g in phosphate fertilizers. Where high annual rates of phosphorus fertilizer are used, this can result in uranium-238 concentrations in soils and drainage waters that are several times greater than are normally present. However, the impact of these increases on the risk to human health from radinuclide contamination of foods is very small (less than 0.05 mSv/y).

Other metals
Steel industry wastes, recycled into fertilizers for their high levels of zinc (essential to plant growth), wastes can include the following toxic metals: lead arsenic, cadmium, chromium, and nickel. The most common toxic elements in this type of fertilizer are mercury, lead, and arsenic. These potentially harmful impurities can be removed; however, this significantly increases cost. Highly pure fertilizers are widely available and perhaps best known as the highly water-soluble fertilizers containing blue dyes used around households, such as Miracle-Gro. These highly water-soluble fertilizers are used in the plant nursery business and are available in larger packages at significantly less cost than retail quantities. Some inexpensive retail granular garden fertilizers are made with high purity ingredients.

Trace mineral depletion
Attention has been addressed to the decreasing concentrations of elements such as iron, zinc, copper and magnesium in many foods over the last 50–60 years. Intensive farming practices, including the use of synthetic fertilizers are frequently suggested as reasons for these declines and organic farming is often suggested as a solution. Although improved crop yields resulting from NPK fertilizers are known to dilute the concentrations of other nutrients in plants, much of the measured decline can be attributed to the use of progressively higher-yielding crop varieties that produce foods with lower mineral concentrations than their less-productive ancestors. It is, therefore, unlikely that organic farming or reduced use of fertilizers will solve the problem; foods with high nutrient density are posited to be achieved using older, lower-yielding varieties or the development of new high-yield, nutrient-dense varieties.

Fertilizers are, in fact, more likely to solve trace mineral deficiency problems than cause them: In Western Australia deficiencies of zinc, copper, manganese, iron and molybdenum were identified as limiting the growth of broad-acre crops and pastures in the 1940s and 1950s. Soils in Western Australia are very old, highly weathered and deficient in many of the major nutrients and trace elements. Since this time these trace elements are routinely added to fertilizers used in agriculture in this state. Many other soils around the world are deficient in zinc, leading to deficiency in both plants and humans, and zinc fertilizers are widely used to solve this problem.

Changes in soil biology

High levels of fertilizer may cause the breakdown of the symbiotic relationships between plant roots and mycorrhizal fungi.

Energy consumption and sustainability
In the US in 2004, 317 billion cubic feet of natural gas were consumed in the industrial production of ammonia, less than 1.5% of total U.S. annual consumption of natural gas.
A 2002 report suggested that the production of ammonia consumes about 5% of global natural gas consumption, which is somewhat under 2% of world energy production.

Ammonia is produced from natural gas and air. The cost of natural gas makes up about 90% of the cost of producing ammonia. The increase in price of natural gases over the past decade, along with other factors such as increasing demand, have contributed to an increase in fertilizer price.

Contribution to climate change

The amount of greenhouse gases carbon dioxide, methane and nitrous oxide produced during the manufacture and use of nitrogen fertilizer is estimated as around 5% of anthropogenic greenhouse gas emissions. One third is produced during the production and two thirds during the use of fertilizers. The single most important way to cut emissions from it is to use less fertilizers. According to Dr André Cabrera Serrenho: ""We're incredibly inefficient in our use of fertilisers," "We're using far more than we need". Nitrogen fertilizer can be converted by soil bacteria to nitrous oxide, a greenhouse gas. Nitrous oxide emissions by humans, most of which are from fertilizer, between 2007 and 2016 have been estimated at 7 million tonnes per year, which is incompatible with limiting global warming to below 2 °C.

Atmosphere

Through the increasing use of nitrogen fertilizer, which was used at a rate of about 110 million tons (of N) per year in 2012, adding to the already existing amount of reactive nitrogen, nitrous oxide (N2O) has become the third most important greenhouse gas after carbon dioxide and methane. It has a global warming potential 296 times larger than an equal mass of carbon dioxide and it also contributes to stratospheric ozone depletion.
By changing processes and procedures, it is possible to mitigate some, but not all, of these effects on anthropogenic climate change.

Methane emissions from crop fields (notably rice paddy fields) are increased by the application of ammonium-based fertilizers. These emissions contribute to global climate change as methane is a potent greenhouse gas.

Policy

Regulation
In Europe, problems with high nitrate concentrations in runoff are being addressed by the European Union's Nitrates Directive. Within Britain, farmers are encouraged to manage their land more sustainably in 'catchment-sensitive farming'. In the US, high concentrations of nitrate and phosphorus in runoff and drainage water are classified as nonpoint source pollutants due to their diffuse origin; this pollution is regulated at the state level. Oregon and Washington, both in the United States, have fertilizer registration programs with on-line databases listing chemical analyses of fertilizers.

In China, regulations have been implemented to control the use of N fertilizers in farming. In 2008, Chinese governments began to partially withdraw fertilizer subsidies, including subsidies to fertilizer transportation and to electricity and natural gas use in the industry. In consequence, the price of fertilizer has gone up and large-scale farms have begun to use less fertilizer. If large-scale farms keep reducing their use of fertilizer subsidies, they have no choice but to optimize the fertilizer they have which would therefore gain an increase in both grain yield and profit.

In March 2022, the United States Department of Agriculture announced a new $250M grant to promote American fertilizer production. Part of the Commodity Credit Corporation, the grant program will support fertilizer production that is independent of dominant fertilizer suppliers, made in America, and utilizing innovative production techniques to jumpstart future competition. 

Two types of agricultural management practices include organic agriculture and conventional agriculture. The former encourages soil fertility using local resources to maximize efficiency. Organic agriculture avoids synthetic agrochemicals. Conventional agriculture uses all the components that organic agriculture does not use.

See also
 Agroecology
 Circulus (theory)
 Fertigation
 Food and Agriculture Organization
 History of organic farming
 Milorganite
 Leaf Color Chart
 Nutrient Recovery and Reuse
 Phosphogypsum
 Soil defertilisation
 Seaweed fertilizer

References

Cited sources

External links

 Nitrogen for Feeding Our Food, Its Earthly Origin, Haber Process
 International Fertilizer Industry Association (IFA)
 Agriculture Guide, Complete Guide to Fertilizers and Fertilization
 Nitrogen-Phosphorus-Potassium Values of Organic Fertilizers 

 
Horticulture
Climate change and agriculture